Industrial inertia (geographical) describes a stage at which an  industry prefers to run in its former location although the main alluring factors are gone.  For example, the raw material source is depleted or an energy crisis has emerged.

An industry may still like to stay in its former position because of its fixed cost (land capital etc.). A firm may also decide to stay in its former location if:

 there is linkage with other activities of the area
 it is in a favorable location for transportation
 there is a skilled labour force

References

 Modern Dictionary of Geography, Michael Witherick Visiting Fellow in Geography University of Southampton, Simon Ross Head of Geography Queen's College Taunton, John Small Emeritus Professor of Geography University of Southampton

Economic geography